Albert Assor (8 January 1895 – 16 September 1943 Krasnoyarsk Kray, Russia) was an Estonian politician.

1938–1940 he was Minister of Justice.

References

1895 births
1943 deaths
Government ministers of Estonia
Estonian people who died in Soviet detention